The long-billed white-eye (Rukia longirostra), known  as Tiht in Pohnpeian, is a species of bird in the family Zosteropidae. It is endemic to the island of Pohnpei in the Federated States of Micronesia.

Its natural habitats are subtropical or tropical moist lowland forest, and plantations. It is threatened by habitat loss.

It has a curious nuthatch-like behavior of creeping along large tree limbs, and seems particularly specialized in using its long, slightly decurved bill to extract arthropods from the severed ends of branches.

Long-billed white-eye seems quite distinct in both plumage, structure, and habits from other Rukia and may deserve a change of genus, possibly to Zosterops.

References

long-billed white-eye
Birds of Pohnpei
Endemic fauna of the Federated States of Micronesia
long-billed white-eye
Taxonomy articles created by Polbot